Isocarpha fistulosa is a New World species of plants in the family Asteraceae. It has been found only in Perú and Ecuador.

One plant produces several flower heads, each head with 120–150 white disc flowers but no ray flowers.

References

Eupatorieae
Flora of Peru
Flora of Ecuador
Plants described in 1981